Visa requirements for Chad citizens are administrative entry restrictions by the authorities of other states placed on citizens of the Chad.  Chadian citizens had visa-free or visa on arrival access to 51 countries and territories, ranking the Chadian passport 92nd in terms of travel freedom (tied with passports from Bhutan and Comoros Islands) according to the Henley Passport Index.

Visa requirements map

Visa requirements

Dependent, disputed, or restricted territories

Unrecognized or partially recognized countries

Dependent and autonomous territories

Non-visa restrictions

See also

 Visa policy of Chad
 Chadian passport

References and Notes
References

Notes

Chad
Foreign relations of Chad